Dahetang is a subdistrict and the seat of Shaodong County in Hunan, China. It was one of three subdistrcits established in 2010, when the former Liangshi Town was divided into three subdistricts, it ceased to be a separate town. The Subdistrict was reorganized through the amalgamation of Huangpoqiao Township and the former Dahetang Subdistrict on December 2, 2015. 

It is located in the central Shaodong County, the subdistrict is bordered by Heitianpu, Lianqiao and Niumasi towns to the north, Liuze Town to the east, Zhouguanqiao Township and Liangshitang Subdistrict to the south, Songjiaping Subdistrict to the west. Dahetang was divided into 38 villages and 12 communities in 2015. Its seat is Huangpoqiao Village.

References

Divisions of Shaodong
County seats in Hunan